A churro is a type of fried dough from Spanish and Portuguese cuisine, made with choux pastry dough piped into hot oil with a piping bag and large closed star tip or similar shape. They are also found in Latin American cuisine and in other areas that have received immigration from Spanish and Portuguese-speaking countries, especially in the Southwestern United States and France.

They are normally eaten for breakfast dipped in champurrado, hot chocolate, dulce de leche or café con leche. Cinnamon sugar is often sprinkled on top.

There are also two slightly different snacks in Portugal, called porra and fartura, which are filled with jelly instead of the doce de leite, traditional to Brazilian churros.

History
The origin of churros is unclear. One theory suggests the concept was brought to Europe from China by the Portuguese. The Portuguese sailed for the Orient and as they returned from Ming-dynasty China to Portugal, they brought along with them new culinary techniques, including altering dough for youtiao, also known as yóuzháguǐ in southern China which bears a resemblance to the churro. The new pastry  was soon introduced to Spain, where it was modified to have the dough extruded through a star-shaped nozzle rather than pulled.

Another theory is that the churro was made by Spanish shepherds to substitute for fresh baked goods. Churro paste was easy to make and fry in an open fire in the mountains, where shepherds spend most of their time.

According to food historian Michael Krondl, "today’s churro is not that different from a recipe for a flour and water fritter that you find in Apicius, a Roman cookbook dating from the 1st Century AD. And there are recipes from the Ancient Greeks but it’s probably even older than that. In the Mediterranean basin it’s basically been around forever".

Etymology

According to the Diccionario de la lengua española, churro is onomatopoeic.

Preparation

Churros are fried until they become crunchy, and may be sprinkled with sugar.  The surface of a churro is ridged due to having been piped from a churrera, a syringe-like tool with a star-shaped nozzle.  Churros are generally prisms in shape, and may be straight, curled or spirally twisted.

Like pretzels, churros are sold by street vendors, who may fry them freshly on the street stand and sell them hot. In Spain and much of Latin America, churros are available in cafes for breakfast, although they may be eaten throughout the day as a snack. Specialized churrerías, in the form of a shop or a trailer, can be found during the holiday period. In addition, countries like Colombia, Peru, Spain, and Venezuela have churrerías throughout their streets. In Portugal, they are commonly eaten at carnivals, fairs and other celebrations, where they are made freshly at street stands.

The dough is a mixture of flour, water and salt.  Some versions are made of potato dough. Depending on the recipe, it may not be vegan, they can contain butter, milk or eggs.

Variations

In Seville (Andalusia), the name "calientes" (meaning hot) or "calentitos de rueda" is sometimes used instead of  the word churro. These tend to refer to the thicker variant, called porra. Calientes are usually fried in the shape of a continuous spiral and cut into portions afterwards. The center of the spiral is thicker and softer, and for many a delicacy in itself. The standard "churro" is also sold under the name "calentitos de papas", the name referring to the softer mashed potato–like texture.

In parts of Eastern Andalusia, a much thinner dough is used, which does not allow for the typical ridges to be formed on the surface of the churro. The final result therefore has a smooth surface, and is more pliable and of a slightly thinner diameter than standard Spanish churros. Another difference is that sugar is never sprinkled on them, because the flavour is not considered suitable.

Filled, straight churros are found in Cuba (with fruit, such as guava), Brazil (with chocolate, doce de leite, among others), and in Argentina, Bolivia, Peru, Chile and Mexico (usually filled with dulce de leche or cajeta but also with chocolate and vanilla). 

In Colombia and Venezuela, churros are round like doughnuts sprinkled with sugar and filled with bocadillo (membrillo or guava paste), arequipe and sweetened condensed milk. In Spain, a considerably wider diameter is used to accommodate the filling. In Uruguay, churros can also come in a savoury version, filled with melted cheese.

Churros in American theme parks and street fairs are most often rolled in cinnamon sugar or other flavored sugars.

In the Middle East, a churro-like fried dough-based sweet is known as Karabeej Halab.

In the Philippines, churros are typically straight, or bent into U-shapes or circular shapes dusted with white sugar and are popular during Christmas

See also

 Andalusian cuisine
 List of doughnut varieties
 List of fried dough foods
 Tulumba

References

External links

Argentine cuisine
Articles containing video clips
Bolivian cuisine
Brazilian cuisine
Chilean desserts
Colombian cuisine
Cuisine of the Southwestern United States
Ecuadorian cuisine
French desserts
Mexican breads
Mexican desserts
New Mexican cuisine
Paraguayan cuisine
Peruvian cuisine
Philippine desserts
Portuguese cuisine
Spanish desserts
Uruguayan desserts
Venezuelan cuisine
Sephardi Jewish cuisine
Philippine breads
Fried dough
Choux pastry